John Rankin Waddell (born 1966), known as Rankin, is a British photographer and director who has photographed Kate Moss, Madonna, David Bowie and The Queen.

The London Evening Standard described Rankin's fashion and portrait photography style as high-gloss, highly sexed and hyper-perfect.

He has directed music videos, documentaries, a feature film, short films and commercials.

Early life and education

Rankin was born in Glasgow. His family moved to Yorkshire in 1976 where he attended Thirsk School, before they relocated to St Albans and he studied at Beaumont School.

He worked as a hospital porter when he was 20 and studied accounting at Brighton Polytechnic until he realised his interests lay elsewhere and dropped out.

Rankin took up photography on a BTech course at Barnfield College in Luton, and then a BA course at the London College of Printing. He did not graduate from either.

Celebrity portraits

Rankin's portraiture includes:-

Music videos
Rankin has directed music videos for artists including:-

Magazines and books

Rankin's works have appeared on the cover of magazines including Vogue, Elle, Harpers Bazaar, Vanity Fair, GQ and Rolling Stone.

In 1991, Rankin and fellow London College of Printing student Jefferson Hack launched the magazine Dazed & Confused. They drew upon their experience with earlier college magazine Untitled.

He launched his own fashion magazine, Rank, in 2000. Rankin is also publisher of AnOther Magazine and AnOther Man. In 2011, he founded Hunger.

Rankin has published over forty photobooks including Female Nudes (1999), Rankin Male Nudes (2000), Breeding: A Study of Sexual Ambiguity (2004), and Beautiful (2007).

Television
Rankin took part in 2008's television reality show Britain's Missing Top Model. The show followed eight young women with disabilities who competed for a modelling contract; photo shoot with Rankin, and Marie Claire magazine cover picture.

In 2011, Rankin was the photography teacher in Jamie's Dream School on Channel 4. He then presented the BBC Four documentary America in Pictures – The Story of Life Magazine.

He travelled to South Africa for 2012's BBC documentary South Africa in Pictures.

BBC Four broadcast his 2014 documentary Seven Photographs That Changed Fashion in which he created tributes to images by Cecil Beaton, Erwin Blumenfeld, Richard Avedon, Helmut Newton, Herb Ritts, David Bailey and Guy Bourdin. Rankin interviewed some of the original photographers, models and assistants, and used contemporary models.

Rankin is a regular photographer and guest judge on Germany's Next Topmodel.

He hosted the 2021 Great British Photography Challenge on BBC4.

Films

Rankin has directed films including:-

He produced visual art for Spectre.

Exhibitions

For his 2009 Brick Lane exhibition Rankin Live, he set out to photograph 1,000 ordinary people, completing one portrait every 15 minutes, each printed and hung within 30 minutes.

Rankin has exhibited at galleries including MoMA, New York, and the Victoria and Albert Museum.

Commercials
Rankin and his production team have created for brands including:-

Campaigns

Rankin has supported Women's Aid, providing photographs for their Blind Eye, What's It Going To Take?, and Valentine's Day campaigns.

Nike and Product Red commissioned him to shoot their 2012 HIV/AIDS campaign, Lace Up, Save Lives.

In 2019, Rankin designed a plastic waste monster and photographed it to support Surfrider Foundation's initiatives against plastic waste.

During the COVID-19 pandemic in 2020, Rankin shot portraits of NHS staff to celebrate their work.

He was a judge for 2021's Holocaust Memorial Day Trust Light Up The Darkness competition.

Rankin has photographed campaigns for Amnesty International; the Institute of Cancer Research; Oxfam; the Teenage Cancer Trust, and Breast Cancer Awareness

Studio

In 2009 Rankin developed Annroy, a contemporary building in Kentish Town. It was designed by Trevor Horne Architects and incorporates Rankin's photographic studio and gallery. The name is a portmanteau of his parents' given names.

Personal life
Rankin was married to actress Kate Hardie from 1995 to 1998. Since 2009 he has been married to model and yoga teacher Tuuli Shipster.

He is a supporter of Battersea Dogs & Cats Home, where his wife volunteers and has donated a series of photographs to the charity.

Awards
Honorary Fellowship of the Royal Photographic Society (2002)
Co-awardee for Best Advertising and Best Editing – London Fashion Film Festival (2015)
Lifetime Achievement Award - Mercedes-Benz Bokeh Fashion Film Festival (2016)
British Photography Awards Fellowship (2019)

References

External links

 

Alumni of the University of Brighton
Alumni of the University of the Arts London
Scottish film directors
Fashion photographers
Living people
Photographers from Glasgow
Television commercial directors
Music video directors
1966 births
Portrait photographers
British portrait photographers
Anglo-Scots